Cameron Redpath (born 23 December 1999 in Narbonne, France) is a Scotland international rugby union player who plays as an inside centre for Bath in the Gallagher Premiership.

Rugby Union career

Professional career

He came through the Sale Sharks academy and played 22 games for the club before joining Bath Rugby in February 2020.

International career

Redpath represented England under-20 in the 2018 Six Nations Under 20s Championship, scoring tries against Wales and France. Redpath was selected in England's 34-man squad for their 2018 summer tour of South Africa but was unable to travel with the squad because of injury. He scored a try against Scotland in the 2019 Six Nations Under 20s Championship. He also played at the 2019 World Rugby Under 20 Championship however his tournament came to an end when he received a six-week ban for biting an opponent in their penultimate match against Ireland.

In January 2021, Redpath was selected in the Scotland 2021 Six Nations Championship squad. On 6 February 2021 he started for Scotland at Centre in the Calcutta Cup against England. Redpath came on as a replacement versus Wales in the 2022 Six Nations match.

Personal life
He is the son of former Scotland international Bryan Redpath. Cameron Redpath was educated at Cheltenham College, The King's School, Macclesfield, and Sedbergh School on a scholarship.

Bryan Redpath's nickname as a player was "Basil" and whilst at Sale his son was given the nickname "boom boom" as a result due to the association with the children’s television character Basil Brush.

References

External links

Bath profile

1999 births
Living people
Scottish rugby union players
Sale Sharks players
Bath Rugby players
Rugby union centres
People educated at The King's School, Macclesfield
People educated at Sedbergh School
Scotland international rugby union players